Prince Kosi Samuzu (born 6 March 1993) is a Democratic Republic of the Congo judoka. He competed at the 2019 African Games, winning a bronze medal in the men's –100 kg category. He also competed in the 2015 African Games but did not win a medal.

References

External links 
 

1993 births
Living people
Democratic Republic of the Congo male judoka
African Games bronze medalists for DR Congo
African Games medalists in judo
Competitors at the 2015 African Games
Competitors at the 2019 African Games